Pediocactus (Greek: πεδίον (pedion) means "plain", "flat", "field") is a genus of cacti. The genus comprises between 6 and 11 species, depending upon the authority. Species of this genus are referred to as hedgehog cacti, though that name is also applied to plants from the genera Echinocereus and Echinopsis. Species may also be referred to as pincushion cacti, a common name which is also applied to other genera.

Species
, Plants of the World Online accepts the following species:

Synonyms
The genus has 3 synonyms:
 Navajoa Croizat
 Pilocanthus B.W.Benson & Backeb.
 Utahia Britton & Rose

Sclerocactus and Pediocactus were also at one time reduced to synonymy, but this is not at present considered to be correct.

References

 
Cactoideae genera
Cacti of the United States